Nikolajs Poļakovs (born 2 July 1975) is a football defender from Latvia. His current club is FK Daugava Daugavpils.

Playing career

* - played games and goals

External links

1975 births
Living people
People from Ventspils
Latvian footballers
FK Ventspils players
FC Daugava players
Latvia international footballers
FK Venta players
Association football defenders